Linen from Ireland is a 1939 German drama film directed by Heinz Helbig and starring Otto Treßler, Irene von Meyendorff, and Friedl Haerlin. It was part of an ongoing campaign of anti-Semitism in German cinema of the era, and was also intended to discredit the governance of the old Austro-Hungarian Empire. By the time of the film's release in October 1939, Britain and  Germany were at war, so it was also useful in creating anti-British sentiment.

It was made as a co-production between the German company Bavaria Film and the Austrian Wien Film which had been created following the Anschluss of 1938. The film's sets were designed by the art directors Robert A. Dietrich and Artur Gunther.

Plot
In 1909, in Bohemia, then part of the Austro-Hungarian Empire, the Jewish general manager of a large textile company imports cheaper linen from Ireland, intending to drive local manufacturers out of business, which would create mass unemployment among the skilled weavers. The company's elderly owner in Vienna is unaware of the scheme, but eventually it is exposed.

Cast
 Otto Treßler as Präsident Kettner
 Irene von Meyendorff as Lilly, seine Tochter
 Friedl Haerlin as Frau von Gebhardt
 Oskar Sima as Der Minister
 Georg Alexander as Freiherr v. Falsz-Pennwiel
 Hans Olden as v. Kalinski
 Tibor Halmay as Horvath v. Arpad-Fálvâ
 Rolf Wanka as Dr. Goll
 Karl Skraup as Alois Hubermayer
 Siegfried Breuer as Dr. Kuhn
 Fritz Imhoff as Pollack
 Maria Olszewska as Frau von Kalinski
 Anny Kupfner as Wanda von Kalinski
 Ernst Arnold as Dr. Seligmann
Richard Waldemar
 Robert Valberg as Adjutant des Ministers
 Rudolf Carl as Portier im Miniserium
 Karl Kneidinger as Bieringen, Buchhalter
 Ernst Nadherny
 Otto Schmöle as Nagel
 Wilhelm Sichra as Leinenweber
 Oskar Wegrostek as Wenzel, Leinenweber
 Oskar Werner as Hotelpage

References

Bibliography

External links 
 

1939 films
German historical drama films
Films of Nazi Germany
1930s historical drama films
1930s German-language films
Films directed by Heinz Helbig
Films set in 1909
Nazi antisemitic propaganda films
Bavaria Film films
German black-and-white films
1939 drama films
Films set in Austria-Hungary
1930s German films